The 1979 European Championship can refer to European Championships held in several sports:

 1979 European Rugby League Championship
 EuroBasket 1979